Clarence is a 1937 American comedy film directed by George Archainbaud and written by Grant Garett and Seena Owen. The film stars Roscoe Karns, Eleanore Whitney, Eugene Pallette, Johnny Downs, Inez Courtney and Charlotte Wynters. It is based on the play Clarence by Booth Tarkington. The film was released on February 12, 1937, by Paramount Pictures.

Plot

Mistaken for a cab driver, Clarence Smith good-naturedly drives Mr. Wheeler home, where he promptly offers his services as a handyman who can fix just about anything. The Wheeler family gets to know Clarence and trust him with their secrets, like Wheeler's son Bobbie being in love with girlfriend Violet while being blackmailed by housemaid Della.

Wheeler's lovely daughter, Cora, has an older beau named Tobias whom her dad dislikes. Tobias plants thoughts in the family's heads that Clarence is a con man, out to swindle them. But not only does Clarence convince everyone of his honorable intentions, he wins Cora's heart as well.

Cast  
Roscoe Karns as Clarence Smith
Eleanore Whitney as Cora Wheeler
Eugene Pallette as Mr. Wheeler
Johnny Downs as Bobbie
Inez Courtney as Della
Charlotte Wynters as Violet
Spring Byington as Mrs. Wheeler
Theodore von Eltz as Tobias
Richard Powell as Dinwiddie

References

External links 
 

1937 films
Paramount Pictures films
American comedy films
1937 comedy films
Films based on works by Booth Tarkington
Films directed by George Archainbaud
American black-and-white films
1930s English-language films
1930s American films